Eddinger is a surname. Notable people with the surname include:

Mark Eddinger (born 1958), American musician, composer, arranger, and music producer
Pam Eddinger, American college president
Wallace Eddinger (1881–1929), American actor